Menendez: A Killing in Beverly Hills is a 1994 television film directed by Larry Elikann. It is about Lyle and Erik Menendez, who murdered their parents in 1989.

Cast
 Edward James Olmos as Jose Menendez
 Beverly D'Angelo as Kitty Menendez
 Damian Chapa as Lyle Menendez
 Travis Fine as Erik Menendez
 Margaret Whitton as Leslie Abramson
 Debrah Farentino as Judalon Smyth
 Julio Oscar Mechoso as Lt. Arguello
 Michelle Johnson as Lisa
 Michael Woolson as Craig
 Vincent Ventresca as Nick
 Dakin Matthews as Dean Barrow
 John Capodice as Larry Garth
 Jace Alexander as Carl Flynn
 Dwight Schultz as Dr. Jerome Oziel
 Robert Gossett as Detective Lukes
 Michael Durrell as Bob Winters

See also
Law & Order True Crime
Menendez: Blood Brothers

References

External links
 

1994 television films
1994 films
American films based on actual events
Matricide in fiction
Patricide in fiction
Films directed by Larry Elikann
Crime films based on actual events
American films about revenge
Films produced by Zev Braun
CBS network films
Films set in 1989
TriStar Pictures films
1990s American films